The Hor States, also known as the Horpa States, were a group of five principalities located in the Tibetan region of Kham that existed from the 14th century to the mid-1900s.

Today, the historical territory of the Hor States comprises Garzê County, Luhuo County, and part of Dawu County.

Etymology

The name "Hor" is usually considered to be Turkic; because the Hor states were Tibetic in culture, their population is thought to be Turks that were influenced by Tibetic culture.

Geography

The Hor States were located in the region of Trehor (named after one of the states) or Horkhok in northern Kham on the upper portion of the Yalong River. The traditional five states were:

 Khangsar
 Mazur
 Drango; now the Tibetan name of Luhuo County
 Beri
 Trehor

Each state governed families rather than distinct territory; as a result, there were no clear borders and some land was owned by multiple principalities.

History

The Hor States originated when a prince of the Yuan Dynasty entered the region and had a relationship with a daughter of a chieftain; however,  when it resulted in a child, he had departed. He decreed that the offspring's status depended on its gender; if it turned out to be male, then his son should be made ruler, if it turned out to be female, then no special accommodations should be made; the child turned out to be male; the ruling dynasties of the principalities claimed him as their ancestor. The prince's companion, lama Ga Anyen Dampa, stayed a while longer, founding a prominent local temple. The Hor states next appear in the historical record in the 1600s; when the Gelugpa sect built monasteries (thirteen in local accounts) across the Hor states; this move connected them to the Ganden Podrang elite and amplified the region's prosperity. The Qing Dynasty bestowed ranks on the rulers of the Hor states. The Hor States, unlike many of Tibet's traditional states were not brought to an end by increasing centralisation from the Chinese government; but instead survived the end of Qing rule and became governed from Lhasa. However, a rebellion in the early 1930s made the Hor States practically independent; this continued until Communist rule.

See also
Horpa language

References 

History of Tibet
Former countries in Chinese history